Shaker Heights High School is a public high school located in Shaker Heights, Ohio, a suburb of Cleveland. The high school is the only public high school in the Shaker Heights City School District, which serves Shaker Heights and a small part of Cleveland. Shaker Heights High School is an International Baccalaureate World School, the only public high school in Cuyahoga County to hold this accreditation and offer rigorous IB classes. It is consistently ranked among the top districts in the state for National Merit semifinalists.

According to a 2004 survey by The Wall Street Journal, Shaker Heights High School is one of the top feeder schools in the nation for admission to the most selective colleges and universities.

The high school has also been recognized by Money and Redbook magazines. In 1998, the school was named a "Grammy Signature School" by the National Academy of Recording Arts and Sciences Foundation in recognition of its outstanding music programs. The school colors are red and white and its mascot is the Raider. The high school has an open campus policy, which is in keeping with its  "college preparatory environment", according to former Principal Michael Griffith.

Demographics
Although the population of Shaker Heights is 55% White, 37% African American and 8% Asian or other, The Shaker Heights City School District's approximate enrollment is 48% African American, 40% White and 12% Asian, Hispanic, multiracial or other. The school has received national attention for its efforts to close the gap between achievements of ethnic and racial minority students and non-ethnic and racial minority students. One of the most active organizations at the school is the Student Group on Race Relations (SGORR), which helps foster positive race relations and fight against racial injustice. Founded in 1983, the group has high school students visit elementary schools to "promote good social relations among racially diverse children." SGORR received recognition from the Human Relations Commission of Shaker Heights and the Ohio Governor's Youth Award for Peace, as well as being a finalist for the Isaiah Award of the American Jewish Committee.

In addition, as a way to help narrow the achievement gap, the Minority Achievement Committee scholars/sisters program was established in 1990. The program has 11th and 12th grade high achieving African Americans mentor and serve as role models to underachieving minority students in lower grades using five core values: respect, pride, honesty, sensitivity, and confidence.

Academic program
Shaker Heights High School offers 23 Advanced Placement courses, the largest advanced Advanced Placement in Cuyahoga County. In 2009, 153 students, 38% of students taking Advanced Placement exams, won Advanced Placement Awards because of high scoring on multiple exams, a record for the school. The high school began offering International Baccalaureate courses in 2010 and is the only public high school in Cuyahoga County to hold this accreditation. The first class of International Baccalaureate Diploma candidates graduated in 2012. The district estimates that roughly 90% of Shaker High graduates attend college. The high school ranks in the top 2% of high schools in the country by Newsweek Magazine, whose rankings are based on the number of Advanced Placement and International Baccalaureate exams taken.

Shaker Heights High School sports a science wing with a roughly fifty-seat planetarium and several laboratory rooms. Sciences offered include astronomy, biology, chemistry, geology, engineering applications, environmental science, oceanography, project physics and engineering, and physics.

In addition to English, the school offers six world languages, more than any other public high school in Cuyahoga County, including Chinese, French, German, classical Greek, Latin, and Spanish. In addition, Shaker Heights High School is the only public school in the state of Ohio that offers a four-year-long Greek program. The high school has a Confucius Classroom supported by the Confucius Institute and the Office of Chinese Language Council International (Hanban). The high school also serves as a location for a Chinese language immersion camp affiliated with Ohio State University. The high school has two-week-long student exchange programs with the Universidad del Valle de México in Mexico City, Mexico and a semester-long program with the Ratsgymnasium in Goslar, Germany. Through other student exchange programs such as the American Field Service, United States Department of State and World Learning, Shaker Heights High School has hosted students for over five decades from dozens of nations, including Argentina, Austria, Belgium, Chile, Colombia, Denmark, Finland, France, Germany, Ghana, Greenland, Hong Kong, Indonesia, Italy, Japan, Kenya, Mexico, New Zealand, Pakistan, Russia, Serbia, Slovakia, Thailand, Turkey, and the United Kingdom.

The Asian studies class is offered in cooperation with Beachwood High School and the Cleveland Museum of Art. The program focuses on the history, literature, art, politics, and contemporary society of China, Japan, and India. Students in the class are offered an opportunity to travel to those three countries in the year they are studied.

Extracurricular activities
Shaker Heights High School has a variety of extracurricular activities for languages, sports, the arts, and other areas.

, the marching band has more than 400 musicians, and is one of the largest student organizations in the high school, as well as the largest marching band in Ohio. This number also includes the Raiderettes, a dance team that performs with the band. The marching band went on a trip to Beijing and Shanghai, China in late March and early April 2007, and performs internationally every three years. The bands, orchestra, and choruses also travel abroad periodically, both to perform and to see cultural landmarks. The band performed in Austria, Italy and Germany in March 2010, performing in Venice, Brixen, Innsbruck and Salzburg. In 2013, the Band travelled to The Republic of Turkey, playing a concerts at Robert College and Taksim Square in Istanbul; as well as in Bergama and at the historic ruins of Ephesus. In 2016 the band traveled to Spain to play in Barcelona, Madrid, Valencia and other smaller towns. The band has band camp a week before school starts, preparing a halftime show for American football games during the fall football season. After the marching band season, the school has five concert bands: one Class AA band, one Class A band, and three Class B bands. In 2013, the AA and A class bands, Wind Ensemble and Symphonic Band, respectively, performed at Severance Hall.

The Shaker Theatre Arts Department was founded in its present form by former Artistic Director James Thornton, and has prepared many students for successful careers on stage and screen. Shaker Theatre Department offers a variety of classes, allowing the students to have a full view and access to the "circle" of theatre. Classes include Playwriting, Acting, the Ensemble Program, as well as the theatre management classes Theatre Production Seminar and Ensemble Coordination Management Course. The season includes the fall main stage production, the Ninth Grade Theatre Experience (written and performed by the ninth graders), New Stages (the student generated playwriting festival), and the Spring Ensemble Show (a performance consisting of movement theatre and poetry prose performed by the Senior Acting Ensemble, the Advanced Acting Ensemble and the Junior Acting Ensemble). Other Shaker Theatre Showcases include the Theatre Social, Fall Ensemble Preview, Winter Solstice Sharings, and Theatre awards. Every new Broadway season since 1991 has included one or more Shaker Theatre alum in major New York productions. In addition, Shaker Theatre alums hold positions in every area of professional theatre and the entertainment industry.

Shaker Heights' Latin Club functions as a local chapter of both the Ohio Junior Classical League (OJCL) and National Junior Classical League (NJCL). In 2010 and 2013, the team placed first in the Academic Per Capita trophy, winning more than 180 individual awards, and in 2014, the team placed first in both the Academic Per Capita competition as well as the Overall Sweepstakes competition, a first in the club's history. The club went on to repeat this feat for the next two years. Shaker Heights High School is noted for its strong performance on the National Latin Examination, with nearly one hundred students receiving recognition for high scores in 2010.

The school's student newspaper, The Shakerite, has won numerous awards, including the 2006 Golden Flash Award from the Northeast Ohio Scholastic Press Association and the National Pacemaker Award from the National Scholastic Press Association in 2006. This was the second time The Shakerite received the award. In addition, the paper has received a Gold Medal Award from the Columbia Scholastic Press Association and a First Place Award from the Great Lakes International Press Association.

Students from Shaker Heights High School have won awards at regional, state and national levels at many academic competitions, including the Federal Reserve Challenge, Math League, Model United Nations competitions, National History Day, Poetry Out Loud, Science Olympiad, The Maltz Museum's Stop the Hate essay contest, TEAMS, United States National Physics Olympiad, and the Vex Robotics Competition.

Facilities
There are 82 regular classrooms, ten combined science lab/classrooms, four art rooms, and two music rooms outfitted with instrument lockers. Athletics facilities include locker rooms, an outdoor track, an outdoor FieldTurf athletic field marked for soccer, American football, lacrosse and field hockey, two baseball fields, a weight room, two indoor gymnasiums, a multipurpose room (with wrestling mats and an indoor batting cage), nine hard tennis courts, a dance studio, and a fencing room. In addition, there is a two-floor cafeteria, a senior lounge, a planetarium, six computer labs, a courtyard and a library. The school has three auditoriums: a large one capable of holding nearly 900 people, a small auditorium, and a black box theater under the large auditorium. The auditoriums were renovated in 2008.

Athletics
Shaker Heights High School has teams in several sports, including baseball, basketball, crew, cross country, diving, fencing, field hockey, figure skating, football, golf, ice hockey, lacrosse, rugby, soccer, softball, swimming, tennis, track and field, volleyball and wrestling. Shaker's neighboring sporting rivals include Cleveland Heights High School, Garfield Heights High School, Mentor High School, University School, and Hathaway Brown. The football stadium is named after Russell H. Rupp, who served as principal of the high school for 26 years.

Ohio High School Athletic Association State Championships

Baseball – 1965, 1976
Ice Hockey – 1981, 1993, 2001, 2013
Men's Golf – 1958, 1959, 1967
Men's Track and Field – 1926
Men's Swimming – 1954 
Wrestling – 1954
Women's Field Hockey – 1991, 2014

Other State Championships

Ice Hockey – 1971, 1972, 1974 
Fencing – 2006
Men's tennis – 2000
Women's lacrosse – 2001, 2003
Chess – 1995

Notable alumni
Names are listed chronologically by class year.
 1930 – William R. Van Aken, politician
 1940 – Dorothy Hart, actress
 1941 – Samuel Glazer, co-developer of Mr. Coffee
 1943 – Paul Newman, actor and race car driver
 1950 – Majel Barrett, actress 
 1950 – Dick Brubaker, NFL wide receiver
 1955 – Sidney M. Wolfe, drug safety activist
 1955 – Roger Penske, race car driver, team owner, and business entrepreneur
 1957 – Peter Bergman, writer and comedian, member of The Firesign Theatre
 1957 – Harvey Pekar, underground comic book writer, wrote American Splendor and music critic
 1958 – Jerry Heller, rap manager
 1962 – Jeff Gerth, Pulitzer Prize–winning journalist
 1962 – David Mark Berger, Olympic weightlifter murdered at the 1972 Summer Olympics
 1963 – Bruce Ratner, real estate developer and owner of the New Jersey Nets
 1963 – Rich Stotter, football player
 1964 – Eric Ehrmann, columnist HuffPost; feature writer Rolling Stone 1968-72
 1965 – Stephen Stucker, actor
 1967 – David Icove, FBI Academy instructor and forensic engineer
 1969 – Lee Fisher, Ohio lieutenant governor and attorney general, and member of the Ohio Senate and Ohio House of Representatives
 1971 – Marcia Fudge, U.S. Representative
 1971 – Peter Lawson Jones, Cuyahoga County commissioner
 1971 – Jane Campbell, mayor of Cleveland, Ohio
 1972 – Jimmy Malone, WMJI radio host and stand-up comedian
 1973 – Susan Orlean, writer
 1974 – Wade Manning, NFL wide receiver
 1975 – Keith Black, neurosurgeon
 1976 – Andy Borowitz, comedian and satirist, creator of The Fresh Prince of Bel-Air
 1978 – John Morris Russell, renowned conductor of the Cincinnati Pops Orchestra
 1979 – Kym Whitley, actress and comedian
 1979 – Jim Brickman, musician
 1979 - Thomas Modly, businessman and former acting United States Secretary of the Navy
 1981 – Michael Scharf, law professor and director of Frederick K. Cox International
 1981 – David Pogue, technology writer, journalist and commentator
 1983 – Marc Kamionkowski, theoretical physicist
 1984 – Griff Allen, auto racing promoter, broadcaster, engineer
 1984 – Michael McElroy, Tony-nominated Broadway actor
 1984 – Gerald Levert, recording artist, member of R&B group LeVert
 1984 – Caroline Hoxby, labor economist
 1986 – Sean Levert, recording artist, member of R&B group LeVert
 1987 – Rebecca Dallet, justice of the Wisconsin Supreme Court
 1987 – Keith Rucker, NFL defensive tackle
 1987 – David Wain, comedian, actor, director; cast of The State and member of comedy group Stella
 1988 – Tracy Nicole Chapman, Broadway actress
 1989 – Jamie Babbit, television and film director best known for But I'm a Cheerleader
 1991 – Michelle Federer, Broadway actress, member of the original company of Wicked: The Musical
 1992 – Kathryn Schulz, author and journalist, winner of 2016 Pulitzer Prize
 1993 – Carter Bays, Emmy-nominated writer for the Late Show with David Letterman and writer/producer of How I Met Your Mother
 1995 – Scott Savol, American Idol finalist
 1996 – Ben Simon, former Columbus Blue Jackets hockey player
 1996 – Matt Guerrier, pitcher for the Minnesota Twins
 1998 – Celeste Ng, author of the award-winning and best-selling novels Everything I Never Told You and Little Fires Everywhere
 1998 – Nate Clements, former NFL cornerback
 1998 – Nate Fish, former coach for the Israel national baseball team and Israel at the World Baseball Classic
 1999 – Adrien Clarke, NFL player
 2002 – Kid Cudi, rapper
 2008 – Wesley Lowery, Washington Post reporter
 2008 – Machine Gun Kelly, rapper/pop punk musician
 2012 – Terry Rozier, NBA point guard

References

External links

Shaker Bands
Shaker Theatre Arts Department

High schools in Cuyahoga County, Ohio
Shaker Heights, Ohio
Educational institutions established in 1918
Public high schools in Ohio
International Baccalaureate schools in Ohio
1918 establishments in Ohio